Salvador Díez Zapata (born April 21, 1963 in Albelda de Iregua, Spain) is a retired Spanish professional basketball player.

Clubs
1982–83: Saski Baskonia
1983–84: Tizona Burgos
1985–89: CB 1939 Canarias
1989–93: Valencia BC
1993–97: FC Barcelona
1997–00: CB Sevilla
2000–01: Benfica
2001–03: CB Clavijo

Awards
Liga ACB (3): 1994–95, 1995–96,1996–97
Copa del Rey (1): 1993–94

References
 ACB Profile 

1963 births
Living people
Spanish men's basketball players
Liga ACB players
Valencia Basket players
Real Betis Baloncesto players
FC Barcelona Bàsquet players
Saski Baskonia players
CB Canarias players
Point guards
Sportspeople from La Rioja